Abéché Airport is an airport serving Abéché, the fourth largest city in Chad and the capital city of Chad's Ouaddaï Region.

Facilities

References

External links 
 
 

Airports in Chad
Ouaddaï Region